Roberto Villa (born Giulio Sabetta; December 2, 1915 – June 30, 2002) was an Italian actor and voice actor.

Biography
Born in Casablanca, Villa completed his studies at the Centro Sperimentale di Cinematografia in Rome and he eventually made his way up to acting. He made his film debut in the 1936 film The Great Appeal directed by Mario Camerini. Villa acted in two other films throughout the course of the late 1930s which includes Luciano Serra, Pilot directed by Goffredo Alessandrini and The Fornaretto of Venice directed by Duilio Coletti.

Villa‘s likeness on the big screen was once compared to that of international actors such as Robert Montgomery and Robert Young. By the 1940s, Villa intensified his acting career and worked frequently with directors like Luigi Zampa, Carlo Ludovico Bragaglia, Sergio Tofano and more. Villa worked on stage frequently during the 1950s and moved on to television in the 1960s. He also worked as a voice dubbing artist, dubbing foreign films for release in Italy, most notably Robert Shaw’s voice. Villa’s voice was dubbed in some of his films by Carlo Romano and Mario Pisu. He then retired from cinema and television altogether with his wife during the 1970s.

Personal life
Villa was married to actress and director Adriana Parrella (who he met during a radio session in 1949) from 1952 until his death in 2002.

Villa had a passion for collecting seashells during his spare time.

Death
Villa passed away in his home in Sutri following complications from pancreatitis on 30 June 2002. He was 86 years old.

Filmography

Cinema
The Great Appeal (1936)
Luciano Serra, Pilot (1938)
The Fornaretto of Venice (1939)
Se quell'idiota ci pensasse (1939)
La fanciulla di Portici (1940)
Maddalena, Zero for Conduct (1940)
Ecco la radio! (1940)
La gerla di papà Martin (1941)
Il sogno di tutti (1941)
Marco Visconti (1941)
I mariti (1941)
L'elisir d'amore (1941)
La sonnambula (1941)
Princess Cinderella (1941)
Una volta alla settimana (1942)
Violette nei capelli (1942) 
The Two Orphans (1942)
Divieto di sosta (1942)
Wedding Day (1942)
Signorinette (1942)
La fortuna viene dal cielo (1942)
Il paese senza pace (1943)
 Lively Teresa (1943)
La signora in nero (1943)
Principessina (1943)
La moglie in castigo (1943)
Il processo alle zitelle (1944)
Scadenza trenta giorni (1944)
The Twentieth Duke (1945)
Porte chiuse (1945)
La prigioniera dell'isola (1946)
Hotel Luna, Room 34 (1946)
Un mese d'onestà (1947)
La sirena del golfo (1948)
The Dance of Death (1948)
My Daughter Joy (1950)
Il medico delle donne (1962)

Television
L'amico del giaguaro (1961-1964)
Le avventure di Laura Storm (1966)

Dubbing roles

Live action
Sheriff of Nottingham in Robin and Marian
Romer Treece in The Deep
Keith Mallory in Force 10 from Navarone
General Marenkov in Avalanche Express
Bernie Ohls in The Big Sleep (1946 redub)
Skull in Blackie the Pirate
Palpatine / Darth Sidious in Star Wars: Episode V – The Empire Strikes Back (original edition)
Ira Wells in The Late Show
Harry Coombes in Harry and Tonto
Tom in Tell Them Willie Boy Is Here
Auction director in Untamable Angelique
Turkish Ambassador in Angelique and the Sultan
Harry Greener in The Day of the Locust
George Sims in Bedlam
Professor Ruzinsky in The Sentinel
Isoroku Yamamoto in Tora! Tora! Tora!
M in Octopussy
Tronk in The Desert of the Tartars
Shack in Emperor of the North Pole
Sam Hastings in Power
Carlino in Wait Until Dark
Jeff Newby in The Undefeated
Dawes in The Man Who Loved Cat Dancing
Del Gue in Jeremiah Johnson
Melk Tavares in Gabriela
Ronald Bart in Hanover Street
Colonel Santilla in The Wrath of God
Dale Coba in The Stepford Wives

References

Bibliography
 Goble, Alan. The Complete Index to Literary Sources in Film. Walter de Gruyter, 1999.

External links

1915 births
2002 deaths
People from Casablanca
Italian male film actors
Italian male stage actors
Italian male voice actors
Italian male television actors
Italian male radio actors
20th-century Italian male actors
Centro Sperimentale di Cinematografia alumni
Deaths from pancreatitis